Bryce Montes de Oca (born April 23, 1996) is an American professional baseball pitcher for the New York Mets of Major League Baseball (MLB). He made his MLB debut in 2022.

Early life
Montes de Oca was born in Lawrence, Kansas, to parents Ivo and Susan. He is of Cuban descent.

Amateur career
Montes de Oca attended Lawrence High School in Lawrence, Kansas. He played for the school's baseball team, but required Tommy John surgery in April 2013. He returned in 2014, throwing a  fastball. USA Today selected him for their All-Kansas high school baseball team. The Chicago White Sox selected Montes de Oca in the 14th round of the 2014 MLB draft. He did not sign with the White Sox, and enrolled at the University of Missouri, where he played college baseball for the Missouri Tigers.

Montes de Oca had a second elbow surgery while with Missouri, and pitched  in his first two years. In 2015 and 2016, he played collegiate summer baseball with the Falmouth Commodores of the Cape Cod Baseball League. The Washington Nationals selected him in the 15th round of the 2017 MLB draft, but he did not sign, and returned to Missouri in 2018.
On March 2, 2018, Montes de Oca and two relief pitchers combined to throw a no-hitter.

Professional career
The New York Mets selected him in the ninth round of the 2018 MLB draft. He signed with the Mets, beginning his professional career. The Mets promoted him to the major leagues on September 3, 2022. He made his MLB debut the same day, striking out one batter and yielding one hit, one walk and no runs pitching  of an inning to finish a 7–1 loss to the Washington Nationals.

References

External links

Living people
1996 births
American sportspeople of Cuban descent
Sportspeople from Lawrence, Kansas
Baseball players from Kansas
Major League Baseball pitchers
New York Mets players
Missouri Tigers baseball players
Falmouth Commodores players
Brooklyn Cyclones players
Binghamton Rumble Ponies players
Syracuse Mets players